Roger Stanton is a fictional character in:
the television show 24
the novel series The Dark Is Rising Sequence